Dadrahman Bazar may refer to:
 Dadrahman Bazar, Chabahar
 Dadrahman Bazar, Polan, Chabahar County